The discography of The X Factor Australia consists of music releases from contestants of the show. While some contestants have been signed to record labels, others have released their music independently. Since season one, contestants have achieved commercial success on the Australian ARIA Charts, with thirteen top-ten albums (including three number-ones), eighteen top-ten songs (including five number-ones), and twenty-nine platinum and thirteen gold certifications.

Eleven acts have charted outside Australia, most notably Mastin and season two winner Altiyan Childs who have both reached the top ten in New Zealand with their albums and singles, and season five winner Dami Im whose albums and singles have charted in South Korea. Recordings of contestants' weekly performances from The X Factor live shows have been released onto the iTunes Store since season three, and eighty-six of those performances have charted on the ARIA Singles Chart.

Albums

Studio albums

Compilation albums

Extended plays

Singles

Season one contestants

Season two contestants

Season three contestants

Season four contestants

Season five contestants

Season six contestants

Season seven contestants

Season eight contestants

Other singles

Charity singles

Collaborative singles

Promotional singles

Other charted songs

Season four performances

Season five performances

Season six performances

Season seven performances

By Artist

Certifications

Australia
The current Australian Recording Industry Association (ARIA) certification levels for albums and singles:
Gold: 35,000 units
Platinum: 70,000 units

New Zealand
The current Recorded Music NZ (RMNZ) certification levels for albums and singles:
Gold: 7,500 units
Platinum: 15,000 units

Notes

A  L & J was released as a digital download for a limited time only.
B  "Recovery" was released as a digital download for a limited time only.
C  "Call Me Maybe" was released as a digital download for a limited time only.

References

External links
 The X Factor at Yahoo!7

Discography
Lists of mass media in Australia
Lists of songs by reality television contestants